The Merchant Navy is the maritime register of the United Kingdom and comprises the seagoing commercial interests of UK-registered ships and their crews. Merchant Navy vessels fly the Red Ensign and are regulated by the Maritime and Coastguard Agency (MCA). King George V bestowed the title of "Merchant Navy" on the British merchant shipping fleets following their service in the First World War; a number of other nations have since adopted the title. Previously it had been known as the Mercantile Marine or Merchant Service, although the term "Merchant Navy" was already informally used from the 19th century.

History

The Merchant Navy has been in existence for a significant period in English and British history, owing its growth to trade and imperial expansion. It can be dated back to the 17th century, when an attempt was made to register all seafarers as a source of labour for the Royal Navy in times of conflict. That registration of merchant seafarers failed, and it was not successfully implemented until 1835.
The merchant fleet grew over successive years to become the world's foremost merchant fleet, benefiting considerably from trade with British possessions in India and the Far East. The lucrative trades in sugar, contraband opium to China, spices, and tea (carried by ships such as the Cutty Sark) helped to entrench this dominance in the 19th century.

In the late 19th and early 20th centuries, maritime education expanded to train merchant navy officers. For example, in 1855 Leith Nautical College provided training for seafarers in Scotland. Other maritime colleges developed in this period included the South Tyneside Marine and Technical College, founded 1861 (now the South Tyneside College) and the Southampton School of Navigation, 1902 (now the Warsash Maritime School).

In the First and Second World Wars, the merchant service suffered heavy losses from German U-boat attacks. A policy of unrestricted warfare meant that merchant seafarers were at risk of attack from enemy ships. The tonnage lost to U-boats in the First World War was around 7,759,090 tons, and around 14,661 merchant seafarers were killed. In honour of the sacrifice made by merchant seafarers in the First World War, George V granted the title "Merchant Navy" to the companies.

In 1928 George V gave Edward, Prince of Wales the title of "Master of the Merchant Navy and Fishing Fleets"; which he retained after his accession to the throne in January 1936 and relinquished only at his abdication that December. Since Edward VIII, the title has been held by the sovereigns George VI and Elizabeth II. When the United Kingdom and the British Empire entered the Second World War in September 1939, George VI issued this message:

In these anxious days, I would like to express to all Officers and Men and in the British Merchant Navy and the British Fishing Fleets my confidence in their unfailing determination to play their vital part in defence. To each one I would say: Yours is a task no less essential to my people's experience than that allotted to the Navy, Army and Air Force. Upon you, the Nation depends for much of its foodstuffs and raw materials and for the transport of its troops overseas. You have a long and glorious history, and I am proud to bear the title "Master of the Merchant Navy and Fishing Fleets". I know that you will carry out your duties with resolution and with fortitude, and that high chivalrous traditions of your calling are safe in your hands. God keep you and prosper you in your great task.

During the Second World War, German U-boats sank nearly 14.7 million tons of Allied shipping, which amounted to 2,828 ships (around two-thirds of the total allied tonnage lost). The United Kingdom alone suffered the loss of 11.7 million tons, which was 54% of the total Merchant Navy fleet at the outbreak of the Second World War. 32,000 merchant seafarers were killed aboard convoy vessels in the war, but along with the Royal Navy, the convoys successfully imported enough supplies to allow an Allied victory.

Between 1941 and 1949, the SR Merchant Navy class steam locomotives were built in the UK. Each locomotive of the class was named after British shipping lines from the Second World War, principally those operating out of Southampton.

In honour of the sacrifices made in both World Wars, representatives of the Merchant Navy lay wreaths of remembrance alongside the armed forces in the annual Remembrance Day service on 11 November. Following many years of lobbying to bring about official recognition of the sacrifices made by merchant seafarers in the two world wars and since, Merchant Navy Day became an official day of remembrance on 3 September 2000.

Merchant Navy today

Despite maintaining its dominant position for many decades, the decline of the British Empire, the rise of the use of the flag of convenience, and foreign competition led to the decline of the merchant fleet. For example, in 1939 the Merchant Navy was the largest in the world with 33% of total tonnage. By 2012, the Merchant Navy – while still remaining one of the largest in the world – held only 3% of total tonnage.

In addition, UK merchant marine interests possessed a further 308 ships registered in other countries and 271 foreign-owned ships were registered in the UK.

This included ships either directly UK-owned, parent-owned or managed by a British company. This amounted to:  or alternatively . This is according to the annual maritime shipping statistics provided by the British Government and the Department for Transport.

As a signatory to the STCW Convention UK ships are commanded by Deck Officers and Engineering Officers. Officers undergo 3 years of training, known as a cadetship at one of the approved maritime colleges in the United Kingdom. These include Warsash Maritime Academy, South Tyneside College, Fleetwood, Plymouth University and City of Glasgow College. Cadets usually have a choice of two academic routes; Foundation Degree or Higher National Diploma. Successful completion of this results in a qualification in marine operations or marine engineering. Generally the costs of a cadetship will be met by sponsorship from a UK shipping company. During the three years of training, cadets also go to sea, for a period of a year or more, usually spread across the cadetship. This affords a practical education, that along with the academic time in college prepares a candidate for a separate and final oral exam. This oral exam is carried out with a Master Mariner at an office of the Maritime and Coastguard Agency. Successful completion of the oral exam will result in the award of a certificate of competency. This is the international qualification, issued by the UK government which allows an Officer to work in their qualified capacity on board a ship. Certificates are issued for different ranks and as such an Officer will usually return to complete a subsequent series of studies until they reach the highest qualification.

The first UK Deck Officer certificates of competency were issued in 1845, conducted then, as now, by a final oral exam with a Master Mariner. The training regime for Officers is set out in the official syllabus of the Merchant Navy Training Board. This training still encompasses all of the traditional trades such as celestial navigation, ship stability, general cargo and seamanship, but now includes training in business, legislation, law, and computerisation for deck officers and marine engineering principles, workshop technology, steam propulsion, motor (diesel) propulsion, auxiliaries, mechanics, thermodynamics, engineering drawing, ship construction, marine electrics as well as practical workshop training for engineering officers.

Historically a person wishing to become a captain, or master prior to about 1969, had three choices: to attend one of the three elite naval schools from the age of 12, the fixed-base HMS Conway and HMS Worcester or Pangbourne Nautical College, which would automatically lead to an apprenticeship as a seagoing cadet officer; apply to one of several training programmes elsewhere; or go to sea immediately by applying directly to a merchant shipping company at about age 17. Then there would be three years (with prior training or four years without) of seagoing experience aboard ship, in work-clothes and as mates with the deck crew, under the direction of the bo'sun cleaning bilges, chipping paint, polishing brass, cement washing freshwater tanks, and holystoning teak decks, and studying navigation and seamanship on the bridge in uniform, under the direction of an officer, before taking exams to become a second mate.

Historically, the composition of the crew on UK ships was diverse. This was a characteristic of the extant of the shipping companies trade, the extent of the British Empire and the availability of crew in different ports. One ship might have a largely all British crew, while another might have a crew composed of many Indians, Chinese or African sailors. Crews from outside Britain were usually drawn from areas in which the ship traded, so Far East trading ships had either Singapore or Hong Kong crews, banana boats had West Indian crews, ships trading to West Africa and Southern Africa had African crews and ships trading to the Indian Ocean (including East Africa) had crews from the Indian subcontinent. Crews made up of recruits from Britain itself were commonly used on ships trading across the North Atlantic, to South America and to Australia and New Zealand. Traditionally and still now, the ships crew is run by the Bosun, as overseen by a responsible Deck Officer, usually the Chief Mate. A ship may also have different sub-departments, such as the galley, radio department or hospitality services, overseen by a Chief Cook, Radio Officer or Chief Steward. Many of these roles have now changed, as ships crews have become smaller in commercial shipping. On most ships the Radio department has disappeared, along with the Radio Officer (colloquially known as 'sparks') replaced by changes in technology and the requirement under the STCW Convention for Deck Officers to hold individual certification in the GMDSS System. Electro-technical Officers (ETO) also serve aboard some ships and are trained to fix and maintain the more complex systems.

Flags

Ensigns
Ensigns are displayed at the stern of the vessel or displayed on the gaff, on a yardarm. Red Ensigns can be defaced, those can only be flown with a warrant on board the vessel. Bermuda (historically part of British North America, but left out of the Confederation of Canada) flies the red ensign also as a territorial flag on land, as did other British North American colonies that still do so as Provinces of modern Canada, including Ontario (other British Overseas Territories that fly a nautical ensign as the territorial flag on land use the Blue Ensign which in Bermuda is only flown from civil government vessels such as ferry boats).

British Overseas Territories and Crown Dependencies ensigns

Yacht club ensigns

Institution ensigns

House flags
House flags are personal and designed by a company. A house flag is displayed on a port halyard of a Yardarm.

Notable people

A number of notable Merchant Navy personnel include:
Fred Blackburn: England footballer.
Chris Braithwaite (c. 1885–1944): seafarers' organiser and Pan-Africanist.
Joseph Conrad: joined the Merchant Navy in 1874, rising through the ranks of Second Mate and First Mate, to Master in 1886. Left in order to write professionally, becoming one of the 20th century's greatest novelists.
James Cook: FRS. (1728–1779) British explorer.
Lionel 'Buster' Crabb: Naval frogman, cadet at HMS Conway 1923-1925.
Victoria Drummond: MBE, (1894–1978) Britain's first woman ship's engineer.
Ian Duncan-Smith Politician. Cadet at HMS Conway 1968-1972.
Gerry Fitt: founder of the Social Democratic and Labour Party in Northern Ireland
Air Marshal Sir Peter Horsley: Deputy Commander in Chief of RAF Strike Command 1973–75. He started work as a deck boy in 1939 aboard TSS Cyclops.
Charles Howard GC FRS FRSE (1906–1941), Earl of Suffolk and of Berkshire. Apprentice officer on the windjammer Mount Stewart; bomb disposal expert in World War II.
Gareth Hunt: actor, notably in The New Avengers, and Upstairs, Downstairs
Violet Jessop: stewardess who survived the  sinking, and author of autobiography about sailing.
Frank Laskier: WWII Merchant Navy steward who became a public icon for recruitment efforts.
Freddie Lennon: Merchant Navy steward whose son John later founded the musical group The Beatles.
Kevin McClory: Irishman who spent 14 days in a lifeboat and later went on to write the James Bond movies Never Say Never Again and Thunderball.
John Masefield: served in Merchant Navy in 1890s: Cadet at HMS Conway 1891-1894. later Poet Laureate.
Henry Nelson, 7th Earl Nelson
Peter de Neumann: GM. "The Man From Timbuctoo", The "de Neumann Way" named for him.
Alun Owen: later wrote the screenplay for A Hard Day's Night.
Frederick Daniel Parslow: VC. Merchant Navy recipient of the Victoria Cross.
Arthur Phillip: joined the Merchant Navy in 1751 and 37 years later founded the city of Sydney, Australia as the First Governor of New South Wales, which then included the eastern half of the Australia we know today, plus New Zealand.
John Prescott: Merchant Navy steward who became Deputy Prime Minister in 1997 under Tony Blair.
Ken Russell: directed films such as Tommy, Altered States, and The Lair of the White Worm.
Archibald Bisset Smith: VC. Merchant Navy Victoria Cross recipient.
Captain Matthew Webb: (19 January 184824 July 1883) Cadet at HMS Conway 1860-1862 was the first recorded person to swim the English Channel without the use of artificial aids.

Medals and awards

Members of the UK Merchant Navy have been awarded the Victoria Cross, George Cross, George Medal, Distinguished Service Order, and Distinguished Service Cross for their actions while serving in the Merchant Navy. Canadian Philip Bent, ex-British Merchant Navy, joined the British Army at the outbreak of World War I and won the Victoria Cross. Members of the Merchant Navy who served in either World War also received relevant campaign medals.

In the Second World War many Merchant Navy members received the King's Commendation for Brave Conduct. Lloyd's of London awarded the Lloyd's War Medal for Bravery at Sea to 541 Merchant Navy personnel for their bravery in 1939–45. Many Royal Humane Society medals and awards have been conferred on Merchant Navy seafarers for acts of humanity in both war and peacetime.

In September 2016 the UK Government introduced the Merchant Navy Medal for Meritorious Service. The medal is awarded:

"to those who are serving or have served in the Merchant Navy and fishing fleets of the UK, Isle of Man or Channel Islands for exemplary service and devotion to duty, rewarding those who have set an outstanding example to others."

It is the first state award for meritorious service in the history of the Merchant Navy. Recipients must be nominated by someone other than themselves, with at least two written letters of support and are normally required to have completed 20 years service in the Merchant Navy (although in exceptional circumstances it may be less).

Ranks

British shipping companies
The British Merchant Navy consists of various private shipping companies. Over the decades many companies have come and gone, merged, changed their name or changed owners. British Shipping is represented nationally and globally by the UK Chamber of Shipping, headquartered in London. British shipping registrars belong to the Red Ensign Group. 

Below is a list of some of the British shipping companies, past and present:

 
Aberdeen Line
Alexander Shipping Co.
American and Indian Line; Bucknall Steamship Lines
Anchor-Donaldson
Anchor Line
Australind Steam Navigation Company 
Anglo-Saxon Petroleum Company (Shell Tankers), now Royal Dutch Shell
Atlantic Steam Navigation Company
Bank Line
Ben Line
Bibby Line
Blue Anchor Line
Blue Funnel Line (Alfred Holt)
Blue Star Line
Booth Steamship Company
Bolton Steam Shipping Co. Ltd.
Bowker and King
British and African Steam Navigation Company
British and Burmese Steam Navigation Company
British India Steam Navigation Company
BP
British Tanker Company
Thos & Jno Brocklebank Ltd
Bullard, King and Company, including Natal Direct Line
Burns and Laird Lines
Byron Marine Ltd
Cairns, Noble and Company
Caledonian MacBrayne, formerly Caledonian Steam Packet Company and David MacBrayne
Carisbrooke Shipping
P & A Campbell
The China Navigation Company
Clan Line
Clyde Shipping Company
Coast Lines
William Cory and Son
Counties Ship Management
Crescent Shipping
Cunard Line
Currie Line – Leith
Denholm Line Steamers
Donaldson Line
Donaldson Atlantic Line
Dundee, Perth and London Shipping Company
Eagle Oil and Shipping Company
Elder Dempster Lines, including Glen Line and Shire Line
Ellerman Lines, including many companies taken over
Evan Thomas Radcliffe
Federal Steam Navigation Company
Fisher, Renwick Manchester – London Steamers
Fletcher Shipping Ltd.
Furness Withy
Fyffes Line
GATX-Owego Steam Navigation Company
General Steam Navigation Company
Global Marine Systems, previously Cable & Wireless Marine and British Telecom Marine
Harrison Line (T&J Harrison)
Harrison Clyde Ltd Woodside Crescent Glasgow
Head Line Ulster Steamship Co. Ltd. – Belfast
P Henderson and Company
JP Henry and MacGregor – Leith
Houlder Brothers and Company (Houlder Line)
RP Houston and Company (Houston Line)
Indo-China Steam Navigation Company Ltd.
Isle of Man Steam Packet Company
 Isles of Scilly Steamship Company
Lamport and Holt
Leyland Line
London & Overseas Freighters
Loch Line
Manchester Liners
Mississippi and Dominion Steamship Company (Dominion Line)
North of Scotland and Orkney and Shetland Steam Navigation Company
North Star Shipping
Ocean Steam Navigation Company (White Star Line)
Orient Steam Navigation Company (Anderson, Green and Company)
Palm Line
Pacific Steam Navigation Company
Peninsular and Oriental Steam Navigation Company (P&O)
Port Line, formerly the Commonwealth and Dominion Line
Prince Line
Reardon Smith
Red Funnel Line
Ropner Shipping Company
Royal Mail Steam Packet Company
Wightlink,Previously Sealink its immediate predecessors the Great Western Railway, LMS, LNER, Southern Railway and many of their antecedents
Scottish Shire Line
Shaw, Savill & Albion Line
Shell International Shipping Services
Silver Line
Stag Line
Star Line
Stephenson Clarke Shipping
Townsend Brothers Ferries, later Townsend Thoresen
Tyne-Tees Steam Shipping Company
Union-Castle Line
United Africa Company
United Baltic Corporation
Wandsworth and District Gas Company
Andrew Weir and Company
Wilson Line
Yeoward Line

See also

Equivalent Royal Navy ranks in the Merchant Navy
His Majesty's Coastguard
List of merchant navy capacity by country
Ratings in the Merchant Navy (United Kingdom)
Royal Naval Reserve
Transport in the United Kingdom
United States Merchant Marine
Witherby Publishing Group

References

Bibliography

External links

 The Marine Society
 Mercantile Marine Community
 British Merchant Navy Association
Records of World War Two Medals issued to Merchant Seamen from The National Archives.
Search and download WW2 Merchant Shipping movement cards from The National Archives.

Historical
 Photos of the Merchant Marine Memorials in London
 Tramp Steamers and Liberty Gallery

Educational and professional
 Maritime and Coastguard Agency UK
 The Merchant Navy Training Board
 Nautilus International
 The Nautical Institute
 Merchant Navy Colleges
 UK Chamber of Shipping

 
Ship registration
Military history of the United Kingdom during World War II
United Kingdom home front during World War II